Sport Clube Vila Real  (abbreviated as SC Vila Real ) is a Portuguese football club based in Vila Real in the district of Vila Real.

Background
SC Vila Real currently plays in the Terceira Divisão Série B which is the fourth tier of Portuguese football. The club was founded in 1920 and they play their home matches at the Complexo Desportivo Monte Da Forca in Vila Real. The stadium is able to accommodate 5,500 spectators.

The closest they ever came to play in Primeira Divisão/Liga was in 1944, when they won the Segunda Divisão Norte regional division but lost the Segunda Divisão Grand Final 2–3 to Estoril. Vila Real never again would compete for a top flight place, yo-yoing between Segunda and Terceira Divisão until 1978 when they were relegated from Segunda for the last time.

The club is affiliated to Associação de Futebol de Vila Real and has competed in the AF Vila Real Taça. The club has also entered the national cup competition known as Taça de Portugal on numerous occasions.

Appearances

II Divisão B: 35

Season to season

League history

Honours
Terceira Divisão: 1952/53, 2000/01
Campeonato de Vila Real: 1924/25, 1925/26, 1926/27, 1927/28, 1928/29, 1929/30, 1930/31, 1931/32, 1932/33, 1933/34, 1934/35, 1935/36, 1936/37, 1937/38, 1938/39, 1939/40, 1940/41, 1941/42, 1942/43, 1943/44, 1944/45, 1945/46, 1946/47
AF Vila Real Divisão de Honra: 2007/08, 2010/11, 2013/14

Current squad
Updated 24 December 2021

Notable former managers
 Manuel Machado
 Quim

Footnotes

External links
Official website 

Football clubs in Portugal
Association football clubs established in 1920
1920 establishments in Portugal
Sport in Vila Real